Ratchet & Clank is a 2016 computer-animated science fiction comedy film produced by Rainmaker Entertainment and distributed by Gramercy Pictures in the US, based on Insomniac Games' video game series of the same name. The film was directed by Kevin Munroe, co-directed by Jericca Cleland, and stars the voices of Paul Giamatti, John Goodman, Bella Thorne, Rosario Dawson, Vincent Tong, Andrew Cownden and Sylvester Stallone. James Arnold Taylor and David Kaye reprise their roles as the titular characters alongside Jim Ward and Armin Shimerman as their respective characters.

The film features an original story, loosely based on the 2002 video game, written by Munroe, Gerry Swallow, and former Insomniac senior writer T.J. Fixman, who began writing for the series with the Ratchet & Clank Future trilogy. Alongside several cast members from the games, Insomniac contributed to the film's production with character development, screenplay, and animation assets.

Released on April 29, 2016, the film received negative reviews and grossed $14 million worldwide on a $20 million budget. It was the first and only animated film from Gramercy Pictures; the label was shut down in 2016.

Plot 
In the Solana Galaxy, Chairman Drek and his people, the Blarg, are systemically dismantling multiple planets to extract desirable material for the construction of an artificial planet, New Quartu. The Blarg need this new world as their home, Quartu, has been rendered uninhabitable by pollution. The destruction attracts the attention of the peacekeeping Galactic Rangers. At a factory that produces Drek's warbots on Quartu, a defective robot is produced due to a black-out, and flies to Kerwan to inform the Rangers of Drek's plan. After getting shot down, he encounters a young lombax spaceship mechanic named Ratchet on the planet Veldin. Ratchet names him Clank, and the two fly to Kerwan, where they save the Rangers from Drek's army of warbots. Their actions gain both Ratchet and Clank immense popularity, which pressures the commander of the Rangers, Captain Qwark, to name them honorary Rangers.

Qwark, jealous of Ratchet and Clank's acclaim, is approached by Drek to help him, an offer he accepts so long as Drek never harms the other Rangers. Drek has him disable the Rangers' weapons during an assault on his planet-destroying superweapon, the Deplanetizer. Drek's lieutenant, Victor Von Ion, boards the Rangers' flagship and attacks Clank, who manages to reduce him to a rusty wreck using a rainstorm-producing weapon. After Drek breaks apart the planet Novalis, his chief scientist, Doctor Nefarious (who orchestrated Qwark's betrayal), suddenly fires a sheep transforming gun at Drek, stuffs him in an escape pod and ejects him to New Quartu. He takes control of the Deplanetizer, intending to destroy the entire Solana Galaxy in revenge for Qwark's mistreatment of him when he was a Ranger. His plan is to destroy the planet Umbris, which has a highly unstable core that would annihilate all other planets in its vicinity.

The Rangers attack the Deplanetizer again, but Qwark intercepts and battles Ratchet and Clank. Ratchet pleads with Qwark to stop, causing Qwark to realize he has been used, and the three confront Nefarious. Nefarious fires the laser, but the Rangers move it off target from Umbris and towards New Quartu, killing Drek who has just crash-landed. Nefarious tries to disintegrate Qwark with his personal weapon, the RYNO (stands for "Rip You a New One"), but is stopped short by Ratchet, causing Nefarious himself to be seemingly disintegrated as he falls into the Deplanetizer's laser chamber. Ratchet, Clank, and Qwark manage to escape through a teleporter as the Deplanetizer falls towards Umbris, where it vaporizes in the atmosphere. With Nefarious thwarted, the Rangers return to Kerwan and Qwark is demoted to Private and ordered to apologize to the whole galaxy. Ratchet and Clank reunite on Veldin, with Ratchet promising to rejoin the Rangers if he is needed.

In a mid-credits scene, Nefarious is shown to be still be alive on Umbris, having his body forcibly converted into a robotic form to survive.

Cast

 James Arnold Taylor as Ratchet, a young mechanic who dreams of being a Galactic Ranger. He was previously voiced by Mikey Kelley in the original video game version.
 David Kaye as Clank, an intelligent warbot defect who escapes and befriends Ratchet.
 Jim Ward as Captain Copernicus Qwark, the egocentric leader of the Galactic Rangers and a galaxy-wide celebrity.
 Armin Shimerman as Doctor Nefarious, Drek's evil chief scientist who has a vendetta against Captain Qwark.
 Paul Giamatti as Chairman Alonzo Drek, the ruthless, eccentric and charismatic leader of the Blarg. He was previously voiced by Kevin Michael Richardson in the original game.
 John Goodman as Grimroth "Grim" Razz, a garage owner on Veldin who is Ratchet's adoptive father and mentor.
 Bella Thorne as Cora Veralux, a rigid Galactic Ranger.
 Rosario Dawson as Elaris, the Rangers' technical support officer.
 Sylvester Stallone as  Lieutenant Victor Von Ion: Drek's robotic lieutenant. He is an original character created for the film.
 Vincent Tong as Brax Lectrus: a large, reptilian Galactic Ranger.
 Vincent Tong also portrays a Solana Trooper
 Andrew Cownden as Zed, Drek's bumbling assistant whom the Rangers often interrogate.
 Andrew Cownden also voices a Blarg.
 Don Briggs as the Starship Commander
 Ian James Corlett as Blarg
 Brian Dobson as Dallas Wannamaker, Announcer, Drek Computer
 Brian Drummond as Mr. Zurkon, Inspectobot, Warbot, The Plumber
 Cole Howard as Stanley: a Blarg troop that Drek and Victor Von Ion bust for texting.
 Alessandro Juliani as Solana Trooper
 Rebecca Shoichet as Stanley's Mom, Ship Computer
 Tabitha St. Germain as Juanita Alvaro
 Brad Swaile as Ollie, Superfan
 Lee Tockar as Mr. Micron, a Tharpod citizen of Veldin.

Production

Development
The film was produced at Rainmaker Entertainment's Vancouver, Canada studio and executive produced by president Michael Hefferon. Insomniac mentioned they were eager to produce a Ratchet & Clank film adaptation, remarking:

Release

Theatrical
The film was released theatrically in the United States via Gramercy Pictures on April 29, 2016, while it was released internationally by Lionsgate and Cinema Management Group. Insomniac developed a "re-imagined" version of the original Ratchet & Clank to tie in with the film, which was released two weeks earlier on April 12 in North America.

Home media
The film was released by Universal Pictures Home Entertainment on Digital HD on August 2, 2016, and on Blu-ray and DVD on August 23, 2016.

Reception

Box office
Ratchet & Clank grossed $8.8 million in North America and $5.6 million in other territories for a worldwide total of $14.4 million, against a production budget of $20 million.

In the United States and Canada, pre-release tracking suggested the film would gross $8–10 million from 2,891 theaters in its opening weekend, trailing fellow newcomers Keanu ($10–14 million projection) and Mother's Day ($11 million projection). The film went on to gross just $4.9 million in its opening weekend, finishing below expectations and 7th at the box office.

Following the domestic opening, Rainmaker announced an impairment charge on their $10 million investment in the film. Commenting on the movie's performance, Hefferon stated "We are obviously disappointed with the North American opening release results. The huge success of The Jungle Book, and continued strength of Zootopia, represented a loss of a large portion of the family market. Although support from the Ratchet & Clank fan base has been positive, the turnout for the film was not sufficient to overcome the highly competitive market place for the opening weekend of the film." In its second weekend, the film grossed just $1.5 million (a drop of 70%), finishing 9th at the box office. Rainmaker lost around $5 million on the film, which made $15 million.

Critical response
On Rotten Tomatoes the film has a rating of 21% based on 80 reviews and an average rating of 4.20/10. The site's critical consensus reads, "Ratchet & Clank may satisfy very young viewers, but compared to the many superior options available to families and animation enthusiasts, it offers little to truly recommend." On Metacritic the film has a score of 29 out of 100 based on 19 critics, indicating "generally unfavorable reviews". Audiences polled by CinemaScore gave the film an average grade of "B" on an A+ to F scale.<ref name="CinemaScore">{{cite web|url=http://deadline.com/2016/04/keanu-the-jungle-book-mothers-day-weekend-box-office-1201746538/|title=Jungle Book' Still Hot In Third Weekend With $35M-$36M; 'Mother's Day' Has Edge Over 'Keanu'|website=Deadline Hollywood|date=May 2, 2016 }}</ref>

Bill Zwecker of the Chicago Sun-Times gave the film 2 out of 4 stars, saying, "I kept getting a sense we've all been here before—both in animated and live-action presentations." Kyle Smith of the New York Post gave the film one out of four stars, saying "Small fry will learn an important lesson taking in the recycled storyline of Ratchet & Clank: Like all recycling, it's garbage." IGN gave the film a 6/10, saying, "Ratchet & Clank is not a bad movie by any means, especially when compared to some of the downright-terrible video game adaptations of the past two decades. But given the humor, action and sense of adventure of the games, the movie is ultimately a competent, shallow, disappointing take on the adventures of the plucky Lombax and his robot buddy. My advice is to stick to the stellar PlayStation 4 game." GameSpot gave the film a mixed review, saying, "Ratchet & Clank pulls us across the universe at a breakneck pace, but it never seems to take us anywhere. The series may have found success in video games, but in the meantime, it's merely stumbled into film."

Animated short
In February 2021, an animated short Ratchet & Clank: Life of Pie'', was released on Crave TV in Canada. The short was produced by Mainframe Studios in co-operation with PlayStation Originals. James Arnold Taylor, David Kaye, Jim Ward, Armin Shimerman and Andrew Cownden return to reprise their roles of Ratchet, Clank, Captain Qwark, Doctor Nefarious and Zed respectively. The short marks Jim Ward's final performance as Qwark, following his retirement from the role.

See also
 List of films based on video games

References

External links

 
 

Films set in Chicago
2016 films
Ratchet & Clank
Canadian animated feature films
English-language Canadian films
English-language Hong Kong films
2016 3D films
2016 computer-animated films
2010s action adventure films
2016 science fiction action films
American 3D films
American action adventure films
American robot films
American children's animated action films
American children's animated adventure films
American children's animated science fiction films
American children's animated fantasy films
American science fiction action films
Canadian 3D films
Canadian science fiction action films
Canadian computer-animated films
Canadian action adventure films
Canadian animated science fiction films
Hong Kong action adventure films
Animated films based on video games
Animated films about robots
Animated films about friendship
Films about shapeshifting
Films directed by Kevin Munroe
Films set on fictional planets
Rainmaker Studios films
Focus Features films
Focus Features animated films
Gramercy Pictures films
Universal Pictures animated films
3D animated films
Films based on Sony Interactive Entertainment video games
2010s English-language films
2010s American films
2010s Canadian films